

The Dudley Watt D.W.2 was a 1930s British two-seat light biplane designed by K.N. Pearson for Dudley Watt. The D.W.2 was built at Brooklands and was a wood and fabric biplane with a tailskid landing gear. It had two open cockpits and was powered by a  ADC Cirrus III piston engine.

The D.W.2 was designed to be offer exceptional handling at low speeds and to be a competitor for the de Havilland Moth family. Only one D.W.2 (registered G-AAWK) was built and this was sold by Dudley Watt in February 1934, it had been dismantled by the end of year.

Specifications

References

Notes

Bibliography

1930s British civil utility aircraft
Biplanes
Aircraft first flown in 1930